Bill Dickinson (1917 – 7 April 1994) was a Scottish rugby union player and coach. Richard Bath points out that Dickinson's appointment made an "immediate impact" in performance, leading to a one-point loss (18-17) to a "rampant  side" and wins against  and others. Allan Massie describes his contribution to Scottish rugby as "immense".

Coaching career
Many of the SRU committee were not in favour of a national coach, so he was named "adviser to the captain" rather than "coach".(McLaren, p181)

"Bill had to operate in somewhat difficult circumstances. But he got on with it and earned the players' respect by his craft, wide tactical knowledge, unfettered enthusiasm and far-sightedness. Scotland gained a new respect under his guidance. In fact, his tactical astuteness helped engineer one of the most successful periods in Scottish rugby history, 1971–77... Bill was a genuine hard man who certainly put fire into Scottish bellies. He created one of the most formidable Scottish packs of all time comprising Ian McLauchlan, Quintin Dunlop or Bobby Clark, Sandy Carmichael, Alastair McHarg, Gordon Brown, Nairn McEwan, Peter Brown and Rodger Arneil. He was a scrummaging expert who brought a new meaning to that phase of play and influenced the thinking in other countries."

Being the amateur era, Dickinson was also unpaid for his work.

"For a few years Dickinson's teams were unbeatable at Murrayfield where at one point they won nine championship victories in succession. Their success and the advent of Andy Irvine, gave the game a popularity it had not seen before. When Wales came north in 1975, 104,000 people crammed into Murrayfield and it is estimated that almost 20,000 more were turned away. Thereafter all major internationals had to be all-ticket."

He was also coach of Jordanhill, where he worked with Ian McLauchlan, and Bill McLaren considered that McLauchlan's success was partly down to Dickinson:

"he had a sage and uncompromising guide in... Bill Dickinson. McLauchlan wasn't taken seriously when he first hit the big time. For one thing he had a roly-poly build and weighed in at just over 13 stones. I have to admit when I first saw him I thought he was just too small for the international game... I doubted that a player of McLauchlan's physique could hold his own with such giants. Hold his own? He gave them all a hell of a time! He posed all kinds of different problems for them because of his shape but also because of his strength which, along with his weight, was being boosted by special training supervised by the crafty Dickinson."

His teams were less successful in away games, and they did not win any games at Twickenham between 1971 and 1983, or any away games against .

McLaren
p180
McLaren says that he considered Bill Dickinson "another of rugby's unusual characters for whom I have a very high respect.", and was horrified to learn that his boast of scoring a try for Hillhead High School FP against Hawick was real.

He was fired by the SRU in 1977, and succeeded by Nairn McEwan, a surprise choice and not a statistically successful one.

References
 Bath, Richard (ed.) The Scotland Rugby Miscellany (Vision Sports Publishing Ltd, 2007 )
 McLaren, Bill - Talking of Rugby Massie, Allan A Portrait of Scottish Rugby'' (Polygon, Edinburgh)

1917 births
1994 deaths
Hillhead RFC players
Jordanhill RFC players
Scotland national rugby union team coaches
Scottish rugby union coaches
Scottish rugby union players